Our Natacha (Spanish:Nuestra Natacha) is a 1944 Argentine drama film directed by Julio Saraceni and starring Amelia Bence, Esteban Serrador and Malisa Zini. It is based on Alejandro Casona's play of the same title.

The film's sets were designed by the art director Raúl Soldi.

Cast
 Amelia Bence
 Esteban Serrador
 Malisa Zini
 Juana Sujo
 Homero Cárpena
 Mario Medrano
 Elina Colomer
 Alberto Soler
 Azucena Ferreira
 Francisco López Silva
 Carlos Castro
 Olga Casares Pearson
 Alberto Contreras
 Domingo Márquez
 Ángel Walk
 Adolfo de Almeida
 Ángel Boffa
 Diana Ingro
 Isabel Figlioli

References

Bibliography 
 Plazaola, Luis Trelles. South American Cinema. La Editorial, UPR, 1989.

External links 
 

1944 films
Argentine drama films
1940s Spanish-language films
Films directed by Julio Saraceni
Films scored by Julián Bautista
Argentine black-and-white films
1944 drama films
1940s Argentine films